Trivia (1716) is a poem by John Gay. The full title of the poem is Trivia, or The Art of Walking the Streets of London, and it takes its name from the Latin word for "crossroads" and from the "goddess of crossroads," Diana, whom the poet invokes in the opening stanza.

The poem, written in heroic couplets, is loosely based on Virgil's Georgics, yet attains a Horatian satirical manner.

The length of the entire poem is approximately 1000 lines, and it is in three books.

Content
The poem describes the perils of walking in London in the 1710s. It is a topographical poem, taking the form of a walk through a day and night. It pretends to utmost seriousness in advising the reader on:

how to dress properly
what sorts of boots to wear
how to survive falling masonry
chamber pots being emptied out of windows
overflowing gutters
pickpockets
wig thieves
mud splashes

Gay also describes the characters of the city, including its ballad singers, chairmen, footmen, and toughs.

External links
The University of Toronto's Representative Poetry Page for Trivia
 

1716 poems
British poems
British satirical poems
Works by John Gay